Fresno City College (FCC or "Fresno City") is a public community college in Fresno, California. It is part of the State Center Community College District within the California Community Colleges system. Fresno City College operates on a semester schedule and offers associate degrees and certificates.

History 
The process of starting Fresno City College began in 1907 with the superintendent of schools C. L. McLane advocating for higher education San Joaquin Valley. Fresno City College opened its doors in 1910 as Fresno Junior College with an inaugural class of 20 students and 3 instructors. At the time it was the first community college in the state of California and the second in the nation.

Academics 
The college is accredited by the Accrediting Commission for Community and Junior Colleges. It offers associate degrees and a certificate of completion. Students can also apply to and attend the on-campus Police Academy, a basic police officer academy accredited by California Police Officer Standards and Training.

Campus 

The Fresno City College campus is located near the Tower District in downtown Fresno.

Organization and administration 
Fresno City College is a part of the State Center Community College District (SCCCD). Robert Pimentel is the  president of Fresno City College and Carole Goldsmith is the chancellor of the SCCCD.

Student life

Media 
 The Rampage (newspaper)
 City at a Glance (newsletter)
 The Ram's Tale (works from English & Art students)
 IntenseCITY (magazine)

Athletics 
The college athletic teams are named the Rams. Fresno City has won 369 Men's & Women's Conference Championships in total and 56 CCCAA State Championships. Men's Basketball (1955, 1963, 2005*, 2007 & 2012), Women's Soccer (1988 & 2017**), Baseball (1961, 1962, 1963, 1972 & 1992), Football (1968, 1969, 1972 & 1973), Women's Tennis (1999 & 2000), Men's Tennis (2004, 2012, 2013 & 2014) Women's Volleyball (2016 & 2021), Badminton (2016), Men's Soccer (2017 & 2019) Wrestling has won 12 CCCAA Duel Championships (1992, 1994, 1996, 1998, 2001, 2010, 2011, 2012, 2014 & 2017) they have also won 17 Team Championships (1959, 1962, 1975, 1989, 1993, 1994, 1998, 2001, 2006, 2008, 2010, 2011, 2012, 2016, 2017, 2018 & 2019)

2005 Fresno City Men's Basketball team went undefeated, 34-0
2009 Fresno City Men's Tennis team of Kirill Sinitsyn/Joao Nogueira were crowned Doubles Champions at the ITA National Small College Championship
2017 Women's Soccer team went 25–0–2 and was awarded the JC Division III National Championship

Demographics

Notable people 

Academics
 Harry Edwards, African-American sports sociologist and civil rights activist
 Gary Soto, Mexican-American poet and children's author, professor of writing
Sports people
 Lloyd Allen, former Major League Baseball pitcher
 Rafer Alston NBA Free-Agent (Member of the 2008/2009 Orlando Magic Eastern Conference Championship Team)
 Greg Boyd- former NFL Defensive End with the New England Patriots, Denver Broncos, Green Bay Packers, San Francisco 49ers and the Los Angeles Raiders.
 Tony Curtis, former NFL tight end
 Rob Deer former Major League Baseball right fielder, played with the San Francisco Giants, Milwaukee Brewers, Detroit Tigers, Boston Red Sox, Hanshin Tigers, and the San Diego Padres
 Zach Diles former NFL linebacker
 Tom Flores 2-Time Super Bowl champion head coach of the Oakland Raiders, also former head coach of the Seattle Seahawks, Flores is a member of the FCC Football Wall of Fame, Member of the Pro Football Hall of Fame Class of 2021
 Matt Giordano Defensive Back for the St. Louis Rams (Super Bowl Champion with the 2006 Indianapolis Colts) has played for Indianapolis Colts, Green Bay Packers, Atlanta Falcons, New Orleans Saints & Oakland Raiders.
 Zoila Gurgel professional female mixed martial artist, Won the Bellator Women's 115 lb Championship
 Ted Lilly retired Major League Baseball pitcher, played for the Montreal Expos, Washington Nationals, New York Yankees, Oakland A's, Toronto Blue Jays, Chicago Cubs & Los Angeles Dodgers.
 Jim Merlo former NFL linebacker 
 Maurice Morris former NFL running back.
 Tom Seaver Major League Baseball Hall of Fame pitcher (member of the 1969 New York Mets World Series Championship Team)
 Alex Stewart, football player
 Andrew Stewart retired NFL and CFL defensive end
 Marcus Walden Major League Pitcher for the Boston Red Sox part of their 2018 World Series Championship team played at Fresno City College in 2007 was drafted by the Toronto Blue Jays in the 9th Round of the 2007 MLB First year player draft.
 Cameron Worrell Retired Defensive Back played for the Chicago Bears, Miami Dolphins & New York Jets, former the Defensive backs coach for the Fresno City College Football team. Now sideline analyst for Fresno State Football on their flagship radio station 1340AM Fox Sports Radio

References

External links
 Official website

 
California Community Colleges
Educational institutions established in 1910
Education in Fresno, California
School buildings on the National Register of Historic Places in California
Schools accredited by the Western Association of Schools and Colleges
Universities and colleges in Fresno County, California
1910 establishments in California
National Register of Historic Places in Fresno County, California